Carine Bornu (born 28 April 1975) is a French former professional tennis player.

Bornu reached a career high ranking of 242 in the world and won two ITF singles titles. She won a further two ITF tournaments in doubles and competed as a wildcard the women's doubles main draw at the 2001 French Open, with Sophie Georges. They were beaten in the first round by Belgians Kim Clijsters and Laurence Courtois.

ITF finals

Singles: 3 (2–1)

Doubles: 3 (2–1)

References

External links
 
 

1975 births
Living people
French female tennis players